A four-day tornado outbreak affected the Central and Southern United States in mid-December 2022. The outbreak produced strong tornadoes in Oklahoma, Texas, Louisiana, Mississippi, and Georgia, resulting in severe damage and three fatalities. On December 13, a high-end EF1 tornado was caught on video from multiple angles as it caused considerable damage in Grapevine, Texas, where five people were injured, and multiple EF2 tornadoes caused significant damage in other parts of Texas and Oklahoma that morning. Two large EF2 tornadoes occurred near DeBerry, Texas and Keachi, Louisiana to the southwest of Shreveport, Louisiana, with the second one causing severe damage and two fatalities. An EF3 tornado struck the northern fringes of Farmerville, causing major structural damage and 14 injuries.

Multiple strong tornadoes occurred across parts of the Gulf Coast region on December 14, and another fatality was confirmed in St. Charles Parish, Louisiana as a result of an EF2 tornado that struck Killona. Another damaging EF2 tornado impacted the New Orleans metro, following a path similar to a high-end EF3 tornado from March 22, 2022. A total of 73 tornadoes were confirmed, making this the second largest outbreak on record for the month of December, with the first being recorded in December of 2021.

Meteorological synopsis

On December 12, the Storm Prediction Center outlined a level 2/Slight risk of severe weather for parts of Southwestern Kansas, Western Oklahoma, and Northern Texas. A brief window for discrete supercells was forecasted, with a risk for all hazards (tornadoes, damaging winds, and large hail) before a transition to a linear mode with a risk for embedded tornadoes and damaging winds. A few supercells developed, producing two weak tornadoes in Oklahoma, neither of which caused any damage. On December 13, as the associated longwave trough ejected eastwards, the Storm Prediction Center outlined a level 3/Enhanced risk of severe weather across eastern Texas, much of Louisiana, and southwestern sections of Mississippi. Environmental conditions were expected to favor the development of semi-discrete supercell thunderstorm structures, with an attendant risk for strong (EF2+) tornadoes. A broader level 2/Slight risk encompassed a larger share of the South Plains, particularly around the Dallas–Fort Worth metroplex where some questions about the level of instability existed but wind shear profiles were conducive for severe weather. During the pre-dawn hours, a broken line of atmospheric convection with embedded supercell structures progressed eastward across North Texas. Here, temperatures in the mid- to upper 60s Fahrenheit overlapped with dewpoints in the low to mid-60s, contributing to modest surface convective available potential energy of 500–1,000 J/kg. Combined with strong shear profiles, atmospheric conditions led to the development of several tornadoes across the Dallas–Fort Worth metroplex throughout the morning hours.

By the early afternoon hours, a surface low-pressure area moved into northeastern Texas, supporting a cold front to the southwest and a warm front to the southeast. In the warm sector of this low, temperatures climbed to upwards of the mid-70s while dewpoints reached the upper 60s; this contributed to mid-level CAPE around 1,000 J/kg. Discrete supercells developed within this environment, tracking northeastward with time. As these storms overspread northern and central Louisiana into the afternoon hours, forecasters warned of the potential for renewed supercell development given the approach of the upper-level trough, both in Louisiana as well as Mississippi. All the while, the SPC renewed a level 3/Enhanced risk valid for December 14 across the Gulf Coast, continuing to highlight a large area for the potential of long-lived supercells capable of producing strong tornadoes. With time, discrete activity across the region congealed into an eastward-moving line of convection across portions of Louisiana and Mississippi. However, as the shortwave trough progressed eastward, strengthening wind fields in a warm sector increasingly destabilized by daytime heating, the SPC became increasingly concerned about the potential for this line to break down into discrete cells. The potential for numerous tornadic supercells to develop prompted the issuance of a level 4/Moderate risk across southeastern Louisiana, southern Mississippi, and western/southern Alabama.

As expected, numerous discrete supercells developed across the open warm sector in eastern Louisiana and southern Mississippi, where forecasters outlined a Particularly Dangerous Situation tornado watch and warned of the potential for a few intense tornadoes. These cells eventually congealed into a line of five or six dominant supercells. As the threat area shifted eastward with time, additional supercells developed in the northern Gulf of Mexico. These thunderstorms progressed northeastward into the Florida Panhandle, southern Alabama, and southwestern Georgia.

Confirmed tornadoes

December 12 event

December 13 event

December 14 event

December 15 event

Farmerville, Louisiana

A low-end EF3 tornado touched down west of Farmerville snapping or uprooting numerous trees, which ended up falling on multiple homes. Moving northeast, the tornado then crossed a portion of Lake D'Arbonne before crossing LA 2, where several homes and outbuildings were destroyed at EF2 intensity. Two injuries occurred inside the two-story home. The tornado then tracked back across Lake D'Arbonne before coming ashore at Corney Creek Drive and Dozier Road. Several residences were destroyed in this area by falling trees, but one cabin was destroyed by a combination of falling trees and wind forcing from the tornado. The tornado then caused  of damage that was unable to be surveyed by the National Weather Service damage survey team. The tornado crossed Denton Road where numerous single family homes were damaged or destroyed at EF2 intensity. One double-wide mobile home here was thrown and completely destroyed, with five injuries reported. Additionally, extreme tree damage with at least a few trees exhibiting some debarking were found in this area as well. The tornado continued causing significant tree damage as it continued northeast towards Union Village Apartments, located along the northern outskirts of Farmerville.

Here, several single-wide mobile homes were completely destroyed. One building in this area had a large portion of its roof and some exterior walls removed by the tornado. Despite the intense damage, it was believed the strongest core of the tornadic winds only clipped the south end of the apartment complex, where the EF3 damage occurred. Dozens of other structures at the apartment complex were severely damaged. Louisiana Governor John Bel Edwards later said out of the 74 units at this apartment complex, only 12 of them were habitable following the tornado. After exiting the forested area, the tornado had significantly weakened, with only EF1 and EF0 damage being observed for the remaining mile of the tornado’s track. In total, at least fourteen people were injured by the tornado.

Non-tornadic effects 

A major blizzard occurred in the Great Plains related to the tornado outbreak, leading to heavy snow and freezing rain. In Fargo, North Dakota, all after school activities on December 13 were canceled. Parts of I-80 and I-76 in Nebraska were shut down due to the blizzard, as was part of I-90 in South Dakota. In Colorado, portions of I-70 and US 6 also shut down briefly. Portions of I-29 were also shut down as the storm approached. The Black Hills National Forest was forced to close for the winter three days early due to the storm. Further east, blizzard conditions and thundersnow were verified in Duluth, Minnesota. Power outages totaled 45,000 in Minnesota, 70,000 in Wisconsin and 43,700 in Michigan. As the storm swept across Illinois, the city of Rockford spent 306 consecutive hours below freezing. Further east in Pennsylvania, at Penn State University, the snowstorm forced the final exams to be rescheduled from December 15 to December 16 and 17. Small portions of I-80 closed due to the storm, and the Skyline Drive in Virginia was also closed. By the morning of December 16, snow accumulations reached  in Wilmington, Vermont. Ultimately, around 50,000 customers in the Northeast lost power.

Impact
Amtrak's southbound Heartland Flyer was forced to go at a restricted speed on the morning of December 13 due to severe weather damage along its route, which included the tornadic damage in Wayne, Oklahoma. Tornadoes on December 14 delayed the westbound Sunset Limited as well as the northbound and southbound Crescent.

Governor John Bel Edwards declared a state of emergency throughout Louisiana on December 13. On December 14, school districts in multiple counties and parishes closed or implemented delayed starts. St. Charles Parish President Matthew Jewell also declared a state of emergency, separate from the statewide declaration, for the Louisiana parish after a tornado killed one and injured several.

On December 15, following the issuance of a tornado watch for parts of Florida, Universal Orlando Resort closed for the day. Disney's Blizzard Beach shut down on December 16 and 17 due to colder temperatures after the system passed through.

See also 
 List of North American tornadoes and tornado outbreaks
 Weather of 2022

Notes

References

December
2022 meteorology
2022 in Alabama
2022 in Louisiana
2022 in Mississippi
2022 in Oklahoma
2022 in Texas
Tornadoes in Alabama
Tornadoes in Louisiana
Tornadoes in Mississippi
Tornadoes in Oklahoma
Tornadoes in Texas
December 2022 events in the United States
2022–23 North American winter